Letya Min Nann (was the founder of the Parein Dynasty  of Arakan.

Early life  

future king was born in 1068 (430 ME) to Prince Min Re-baya (မင်းရဲဘယ) and Princess Saw Pauk Nyo (စောပေါက်ညို), both of his parents are children of King Min Bilu.
The Prince grew up in Pagan and where he later also married his younger sister, named Shwe Gu Tha due to preserving Arakanese the royal bloodline.

Ancestry

The prince's origin tracing back to 
King Khittathin, founder of Pyinsa Dynasty and whom fifth in-descend from him named Min Bilu was slain and killed by an usurper named Thinkhaya, son of the murdered king fled to the Court of Kyansittha and where resided at Bagan and married his own sister, Saw Pauk-Nyo and their son was named Letya Min-Nann.

Reign 

In the year 1103, Arakanese Prince Letya Min Nann was successfully restored to the throne by accelemation of his grandfather in the name of Pagan Sovereign. He was determined to relocate the capital from Pyinsa to newly named place called Launggret.

However, the site proved to be unhealthy and only held temporarily, so he moved the capital to the north past the Paungdok Creek. In the year 1106, he established the new capital, Parein, there and erected a palace named Nan-Oo, on the west bank of Lemro River. He also built the Buddhagaya Shrine in honor of his overlord, Sithu.

The King died in 1109, he was aged 41 and his son Thibaha who succeeded him.

References

Bibliography 

12th-century Burmese monarchs
1068 births
1109 deaths 
Burmese people of Rakhine descent